Virginie was a French-language Canadian television series that aired Monday through Thursday on Radio-Canada (the French-language CBC television network). It debuted in 1996. The show examined the public and private lives of teachers, students, and families at the fictional Sainte-Jeanne-d'Arc high school. It frequently dealt with controversial social topics, such as teen drug use, ethnic prejudice, divorce, and other subjects touching on contemporary Quebec life. "Virginie" was a téléroman-style drama that often used "cliffhangers" in the storylines. It aired 120 episodes per year of 30 minutes each.

The series was produced and largely written by Fabienne Larouche. Virginie ended in December 2010 after 15 years on air; the last episode aired on December 15, 2010. The final episode drew more than 807,000 viewers in Quebec, or about 200,000 more than its average viewership for a typical episode. The program maintained a high level of popularity throughout its television run.

Current main characters

 Virginie Charest (Stéphanie Crête-Blais, 2007–2010) is a physical education teacher at the school.
 Frédéric Perreault (Maxime Denommée), boyfriend of Virginie Charest, is a member of the Royal 22e Régiment and currently based in Afghanistan. The 2009 season finale cliffhanger suggested that the character died on duty.
 Stéphane Lessieur (Peter Miller), former boyfriend of Virginie Boivin and father of her two children. He is currently a police officer with the Sûreté du Québec. He dated the sexologist of the school, Veronique. He is now dating Virginie Charest
 Bernard Paré (Jean L'Italien)
 Pierre Lacaille (JiCi Lauzon)
 Hercule Bellehumeur (Martin Larocque) He is an overweight gym teacher. He is dating Agathe, who is also a gym teacher. Hercule is always on a diet...but loves food and eating too much to resist!
 Péneloppe Belhumeur (Sonia Vachon) She was a teacher at Ste-Jeanne D'arc. She is the sister of Hercule Belhummeur, the gym teacher. She used to date Lacaille, and had a child with him.
 Hugo Lacasse (played by Patrice Bissonnette before the 2002 season, then by Fabien Dupuis)
 Michel Rivest (Marcel Leboeuf)
 Ghislaine Cormier (Louise Deschâtelets)
 Monique Rivest (Annick Bergeron)
 René Ouellet (Michel Forget)
 * Bobby Rajotte (Hubert Proulx)
 Pierre-Paul Laporte (Benoit Langlais)

Other current characters
 “Toutoune” Laporte (Eric Hoziel)
 Cathie Laurendeau (Joëlle Morin)
 Juge Pringle (Réjean Lefrançois)
 Agathe Sirois (Geneviève Néron)
 Sylvain Lajoie (Cédric Pépin)
 Véronique Gagnon (Christine Beaulieu)

Past characters
 Virginie Boivin (Chantal Fontaine, 1996–2008) was the main character until 2008 when she left the series. She was a physical education teacher at the school, who left to live in Saguenay-Lac-Saint-Jean with her two young children.
 Maurice Ladouceur (Jean-François Mercier) Maurice was killed by a drunk driver.
 Louise Pouliot (Pascale Desrochers) Louise left after giving birth to her child.
 Patrick Labbé as Gary Lamothe
 Monique Chabot as Cécile Boivin
 Claude Blanchard as Pierre Boivin
 Anne Dorval as Lucie Chabot
 Jean-François Pichette as Daniel Charron
 Marie-Joanne Boucher as Claudie Paré
 Julie Vincent as Dominique Latreille
 Frédéric Angers as Guillaume Tremblay
 Michel Daigle as Édouard Lirette
 Katerine Mousseau as Mireille Langlois
 Jacques L'Heureux as Julien Constantin
 Nathalie Gascon as Andrée Constantin*
 Véronique Bannon as Karine Constantin
 Patrice Godin as Marc Dubuc
 Pauline Martin as Suzanne Simoneau
 Bernard Fortin as Marc Dupras
 Muriel Dutil as Lise Bombardier
 Frédéric Pierre as Sylvestre Paul
 Alexandra Laverdière as Julie Constantin
 Marie-Josée Normand as Marilyn Potvin
 Fanny Lauzier as Véronique Bernier
 Jean Petitclerc as Michel Francoeur
 Denyse Chartier as Carmen Paré
 Yvan Ponton as Luc Paré
 Denis Bernard as Roger Tremblay
 Laurence Leboeuf as Évelyne Boivin
 Roxanne Gaudette-Loiseau as Pénélope Chabot-Charron
 Omar Sharif Jr. as Oliver Briscbois
 Béatrice Picard as Alice
 Cleo Tellier as Émilie
 Dominique Lévesque as Henri-Paul Dutrisac
 Maxim Roy as Marie-Claude Roy
 Pierre Curzi as Gilles Bazinet
 Robert Gravel as Gilles Bazinet 
 Lucie Laurier as Karine Constantin
 Antoine Bertrand as Patrick Betrand
 Tony Conte as Pietro Curvo
 André Ducharme as Alain Gauthier
 Maxim Gaudette as Éric Pouliot
 Martin Gendron as Stéphane Pouliot
 Myriam Houle as Kim Dubé
 Nicole Leblanc as Yolande Lacaille
 Pierre Legris as Robert Bourdages
 Danièle Lorain as Sœur Jacinthe Lacroix
 Linda Malo as Sophie Lapierre
 Isabelle Maréchal as Andréanne Rocheleau
 Lise Martin as Sœur Rose-Marie
 Dominique Michel as Geneviève Leblanc
 Louis-David Morasse as Simon Laberge
 Iannicko N'Doua-Légaré as Claude Armand
 Patricia Nolin as Marie Lalonde
 Eric Paulhus as Guy Landry
 Julien Poulin as Jean-Louis Beaudry
 Adèle Reinhardt as Normande Legault
 Cleo Tellier as Élève principale
 Geneviève Rochette as Maria-Isabella Ortiz
 Martin Rouette as Videk Striknër
 Jason Roy Léveillée as Steve Ferron
 Isabelle Sénécal-Lapointe as Léa-Marie Clément
 Caroline Tanguay as Annie Legault
 Lily Thibeault as Josiane Despaties
 Daniel Thomas as Philippe Gagné
 Johanne-Marie Tremblay as Ginette Boivin
 Sonia Vachon as Pénélope Belhumeur
 Rosie Yale as Lily Péloquin

External links

References

1996 Canadian television series debuts
2010 Canadian television series endings
Ici Radio-Canada Télé original programming
Television shows filmed in Quebec
Téléromans
1990s Canadian drama television series
2000s Canadian drama television series
2010s Canadian drama television series